Nicholas A. Boldyga is an American politician who represents the 3rd Hampden District in the Massachusetts House of Representatives.

First elected in November 2010, Boldyga's district includes the City of Agawam and the Towns of Granville, Russell, and Southwick in Western Massachusetts. He serves on the House Financial Services, Higher Education, and Public Safety & Homeland Security Committees. He is the Ranking Republican on the House Financial Services Committee.

Prior to serving in the Massachusetts House of Representatives, Representative Boldyga was a member of the Southwick Board of Selectmen and Parks & Recreation Commission.

Outside politics Boldyga has worked as a police office in Simsbury, Connecticut, an auditor for Deloitte & Touche LLP, and has held various positions in the insurance and financial services industry.

Representative Boldyga holds a B.S.B.A in accounting from Western New England College and also a graduate of the Connecticut Police Academy.

See also
 2019–2020 Massachusetts legislature
 2021–2022 Massachusetts legislature

References

Republican Party members of the Massachusetts House of Representatives
People from Southwick, Massachusetts
Western New England University alumni
Living people
21st-century American politicians
Year of birth missing (living people)